The Earl Dalhousie is a full-rigged sailing ship, built in 1862, that transported British settlers in the 1870s to Australia. It was the fifth ship to participate in the Portuguese immigration to Hawaii when it brought contract laborers in 1882 from the Azores Islands to work on the Hawaiian sugarcane plantations.

See also
 Portuguese immigration to Hawaii
 Immigration to Australia

References

Further reading

 

Victorian-era passenger ships of the United Kingdom
Portuguese immigration to Hawaii